Loutolim or Loutulim  Lottli pronounced:, Portuguese: Loutulim) is a large village of South Goa district in the state of Goa, India. It is an important settlement in the Salcete sub-district.

Etymology 
Loutolim derives its name from Lovótollem, coined from the Konkani words—Lovó, a type of grass and Tollem, a pond—since those grasses used to grow abundantly around the pond. In Konkani, the local language, the village is known as Lottli and its native inhabitants are referred to as Lottlikar.

History 

According to a legend, Brahmins from northern India founded the settlement of Loutolim when they emigrated to Goa after the Saraswati River in their homeland dried up.

The village community was based around the temple of Shri Ramnath. There were other smaller temples dedicated to Shri Santeri (Shantadurga) in the village. A new temple of Shri Ramnath was built recently at the same spot. The original idol of Shri Ramnath now stands in a temple of Indo-Portuguese architecture at Bandora, that had been built during the eighteenth century AD.

Beginning from the 1500s, the Jesuits undertook the task of the Christianisation of Salcete and in AD 1567, the Portuguese captain of Rachol Fort,
Dom Diogo Rodrigues ordered the burning and destruction of all the temples in the village. Many villagers were tenaciously attached to their Hindu religion. In order to preserve their culture, they had to flee to safer grounds in the territories governed by the Hindu King, the Sonde Raja, across the Zuari River with their idols, most famously the idol of Shri Ramnath in what was later known as the Novas Conquistas (New Conquests). Those who chose to remain behind had to embrace Christianity. The Salvador do Mundo (Saviour of the World) church was built by the Jesuits in AD 1586 to look after the spiritual needs of the local converts.

Unlike some other villages and towns in Salcete and Bardez, where churches were built over the demolished temples, in Loutolim, the plot of land where the old Shri Ramnath temple stood remained vacant due to some opposition among the locals.

Today, Loutolim has a mixed population of Christians and Hindus, many of them of Goud Saraswat Brahmin lineage.

Geography and demographics

Location 
Its beautiful, scenic surroundings, cool breeze, green hills and blue rivers are distinct to its location between the hills, fields and river. The river Zuari flows along one side of Loutolim and it is surrounded by the villages of Verna, Raia, Camorlim, Borim and Quelosim. The village is easily accessible by road from Margao, Ponda (across the Borim Bridge) and Cortalim (along the riverside about 12 km from the Zuari Bridge).

Language 
The Saxtti dialect of Konkani, belonging to the Indo-European family of languages, is the local language and spoken widely by the people of Loutolim. Konkani, is primarily written in the Devanagari script.

Architecture 
Loutolim is among Goa’s delightful villages, with lush green paddy fields and tranquil village roads that lie under a canopy of forest trees. Architectural relics of Goa’s grand Portuguese heritage can be seen around the unhurried village of Loutolim, some 10 km northeast of Margao. The centre of the village is the majestic whitewashed Church of Salvador do Mundo (Saviour of the World), one of Goa's most impressive Mannerist Neo-Roman-style churches built in 1586.

Culture

Religion 
As in other parts of Goa, in Loutolim, both Hindus and Catholics live together in peace and harmony, mingling with each other during their religious festivals. The religious activities of the Catholics are centred around the Saviour of the World church while those of the Hindus are centred around the Sri Ramnath temple. The Feast of Saviour of the World Church is celebrated on the 3rd Sunday of November every year.

The Chapels located in the Loutulim parish are Our Lady of the Rosary in Carvota, Our Lady of Miracles in Vanxem, Mother of God in Devoti, Saint Sebastian on the Monte (hill), Saint Benedict in Organv and Saint Joseph in Rasaim.

Food and beverages 
Goan cuisine is influenced by Hindu Gaud Saraswat Brahmin origins and Portuguese cuisine as well as a blend of modern techniques. Locals enjoy rice with fish curry ( in Konkani), which is the staple diet in Goa. Coconut and coconut oil are widely used in cooking along with chili peppers, spices and vinegar, giving the food a unique flavour. Various seafood delicacies include kingfish (the most common delicacy), pomfret, shark, tuna and mackerel are also popular. Pork dishes such as vindaloo, chouriço and sorpotel are a legacy of the Portuguese.

The most popular alcoholic beverage in Goa is feni. Cashew feni is made from the fermentation of the fruit of the cashew tree, while coconut feni is made from the sap of toddy palms. The people also drink wine, especially on feast days.

Education and social welfare 
The Educational Institutions based in the parish are Saviour of the world high school, Don Bosco higher secondary school (run by the Salesians of Don Bosco) and the Don Bosco crafts Institute (also run by the Salesians of Don Bosco).

The Social welfare activities include The Saint Xavier boarding for girls (run by the Ursulines of Mary Immaculate) and Shanti Avedna Hospice for the terminally ill (run by the Sisters of the Holy Cross).

Notable people

Attractions 
Ancestral Goa Big Foot: a theme park called 'Ancestral Goa' has been built in Loutolim. Depicting Goan culture and preserving the grassroots of the humble state of Goa. Designed as a walk through village, with cobble stoned streets leading to and from life-sized displays, allowing the viewer an overview of the symbiotic relationship between man and nature including a frozen demonstration of the traditional method of cashew feni distillation.
Saint Mira Bai: Sant Mirabai is a 14m x 5m record setting monolith, a low relif design on laterite rock sculpted by Maendra Alvares of Loutolim, Goa in 1994 Sant Mirabai is a 14m x 5m record setting monolith, a low relif design on laterite rock sculpted by Maendra Alvares of Loutolim, Goa in 1994, made its way to the Limca Book of Records, Unique World Records, India Book of Records, World Records India, Assets Records. 
. “Sangam “ : a sculpture depicting the confluence of various religions
Miranda Mansion: One of the old Goan houses, owned by families such as the Mirandas are sometimes opened for public viewing.
Casa Alvares: A large traditional Portuguese house of over 250 years which had been the home of a wealthy Portuguese family for several generations. The house contained many old home furnishings.
Figueirdo mansion: Built in 1590, the Figueiredo Mansion pre-dates the Taj Mahal by decades. It was designed by Jesuit priests from nearby Rachol Seminary. The impressive mansion is now open as a museum and also hosts an inn.

Gallery

See also 
Ramnathi
Shenoy
Portuguese India
Raia

References

External links 
Casa Alvares — Ancestral house of Araujo Alvares

Cities and towns in South Goa district